BTH Bank is a bank headquartered in Quitman, Texas. It operates 13 branches, all of which are in East Texas and the Dallas–Fort Worth metroplex.

History
The bank was formed as The First National Bank of Quitman on October 21, 1914.

In 2005, the bank changed its name to BankTexas.

In 2013, Bob Dyer was named chairman and chief executive officer of the bank.

The bank received $42 million of equity investments in 2013 and another $45 million of equity investments in 2015.

In 2015, the bank changed its name to BTH Bank to differentiate itself and to comply with intellectual property laws.

In 2017, the bank was ranked third in total deposits in Longview, Texas.

In October 2017, the bank opened a branch in McKinney, Texas.

References

Banks based in Texas
Wood County, Texas
Banks established in 1914
1914 establishments in Texas